Oslo International Jazz Festival (Oslo Jazzfestival, established 1986 in Norway) is a Norwegian music event, held in August, with a focus on music form the jazz genre, performed on stages in Oslo.

History
The pilot project (1984–1985) was initiated by Aage Teigen. The first festival in 1986, had more than forty volunteers and the event received 350 000 Norwegian kroner in donations from Oslo Municipality. The music was largely traditional jazz, Dixieland, New Orleans jazz, etc.
The organization became a Foundation in 1995, led by Truls Helweg, chairman of the board since 1995) and permanently appointed General Manager (Aage Teigen), at a time when the budget was over 5 million Norwegian kroner. Teigen was in 2002 awarded Oslo City Artist Award for his commitment.

In 2006, the festival held 70 concerts (of these 15 free) with 450 musicians on 18 stages with around 70,000 spectators. Aage Teigen was then general manager with more than 200 volunteers, and the music includes all genres of jazz. The new leader from 2007 was Edvard Askeland.

At the festival in August 2013, Nora Brockstedt was honored by a grand concert, where Come Shine and saxophonist Hanna Paulsberg presented highlights from Brockstedts repertoire in "brilliant versions".

Ella-prisen

A sculpture of Ella Fitzgerald is awarded a person who has developed the festival and the Oslo Jazz Scene, created by the artist Mariann Hazeland.

The prize was first awarded in 1995

1995: Randi Hultin journalist based in Oslo.

Later winners are

1996: Stein Kagge, journalist based in Oslo
1997: Totti Bergh, saxophonist based in Oslo 
1998: Kristian Ystehede, multiinstrumentalist
1999: Laila Dalseth, vocalist resided in Oslo
2000: Tore Jensen, trumpeter in Oslo (2000),
2001: Miloud Guiderk, musician and impresario
2002: Eivind Solberg, trumpeter resided in Oslo
2003: Roald Helgheim, journalist
2004: Gerhard Aspheim, trombonist resided in Oslo
2005: Peter T. Malling, businessman and founder of «Jazzradioen»
2006: Hank O'Neal, record producer, photographer and journalist from USA
2007: Bjørn Petersen, leader of Gemini Records in Oslo
2008: Karin Krog, vocalist from Oslo
2009: Bodil Niska, saxophonist and jazz entrepreneur
2010: Arild Andersen, bassist from Oslo
2011: Aage Teigen, trombonist and founder of Oslo Jazz Festival (2011)
2012: Bugge Wesseltoft, pianist, composer, producer and owner of Jazzland Recordings
2013: Erlend Skomsvoll, pianist, composer and orchestra leader
2014: Odd André Elveland, as the founder of Improbasen and Kids in Jazz
2015: Espen Nilsen, manager of the jazz venue "Herr Nilsen" in Oslo
2016: John Trehjørningen, jazz enthusiast and  active at the Oslo Jazzfestival
2017: Bjørn Stendahl, jazz historian
2018: Jon Christensen, jazz drummer
2019: Paolo Vinaccia, drummer
2020: Hanna Paulsberg, saxophonist
2021: Kristoffer Kompen, trombonist

Usbl Jazztalent award
Prize awarded to a young jazz musician annually at Oslo Jazzfestival since 2019. The prize is funded by Boligbyggelaget Usbl and consists of NOK. 30,000, -, in addition to a concert during the subsequent Oslo Jazz Festival. The prize was awarded for the first time at the Oslo Jazz Festival's opening concert on 11 August 2019 in the Norwegian Opera & Ballet by Usbl director Johan Bruun to musician Daniela Reyes Holmsen.

 2019 Daniela Reyes Holmsen
 2020 Veslemøy Narvesen
 2021 Ola Erlien

Statkraft's Young Star Grant
Scholarship which was awarded to a musician or a band (age 18–25) which has been noticed on local, regional and / or national level. The grant supported by Statkraft provides 50,000 Norwegian kroner and included a gig with an optional project during the subsequent festival., in the period between 2007 and 2013.

2007: Marianne Halmrast
2008: Jørgen Mathisen
2009: Guro Skumsnes Moe
2010: Kristoffer Kompen
2011: Anja Lauvdal
2012: Ellen Andrea Wang
2013: Ingrid Søfteland Neset

References

External links

1986 establishments in Norway
Music festivals established in 1986
Jazz festivals in Norway
Music festivals in Oslo
Annual events in Norway
Summer events in Norway